Lechitel is a Bulgarian newspaper. The newspaper has articles about the health as well as guides to living a better life. The newspaper is produced on a weekly basis. The newspaper had approximately 10,000 readers.

Rubrics
Human health 
Animals and pets health
Herbs and their protection
advice from Bulgarian and world doctors and therapist
advice for health body
medical administration in Bulgaria

Weekly newspapers published in Bulgaria